Pur Janki (also Romanized as Pūr Jankī; also known as Pūr Changī and Pūr Jangī) is a village in Nazil Rural District, Nukabad District, Khash County, Sistan and Baluchestan Province, Iran. At the 2006 census, its population was 123, in 35 families.

References 

Populated places in Khash County